Farmer suicides in India refers to the national catastrophe of farmers committing suicide since the 1970s, due to their inability to repay loans mostly taken from private landlords and banks.
NCRB data shows that the incidence of farmer suicides has remained high in the 6 years between 2014 and 2020. Fifty-six hundred farmers committed suicide in 2014, and 5,500 farmers committed suicide in 2020. If the agricultural labourers are added to the 2020 number, the number of suicides rises to over 10,600.

The National Crime Records Bureau of India reported that a total of 296,438 Indian farmers had committed suicide between 1995-2014. Out of these, 60,750 farmer suicides were in the state of Maharashtra since 1995 and the remaining in Odisha, Telangana, Andhra Pradesh, Madhya Pradesh, Gujarat and Chhattisgarh, all states with loose financial and entry regulations.

Earlier, governments had reported varying figures, from 5,650 farmer suicides in 2014 to the highest number of farmer suicides in 2004 of 18,241. The farmer's suicide rate in India had ranged between 1.4 and 1.8 per 100,000 total population, over a 10-year period through 2005, however, the figures in 2017 and 2018 showed an average of more than 10 suicides daily or 5760 suicides per year. There are accusations of states manipulating the data on farmer suicides, hence the real figures could be even higher.

India is an agrarian country with around 70% of its people depending directly or indirectly upon agriculture. Agriculture had 15.4% share in economy of India in year 2017. Around 41.49% of total labor are associated with agriculture in year 2020. Farmer suicides account for 11.2% of all suicides in India. Activists and scholars have offered a number of conflicting reasons for farmer suicides, such as anti farmer laws, high debt burdens, poor government policies, corruption in subsidies, crop failure, mental health, personal issues and family problems.

Farmers' income rose by 30 per cent while their debt surged around 58 per cent between 2013 and 2019. As a result, farmers' debt as a percentage of their annual income shot up by 13 percentage points, according to latest data released by the Ministry of Statistics and Programme Implementation.

History

Historical records relating to frustration, revolts, and high mortality rates among farmers in India, particularly cash crop farmers, date back to the 19th century. However, suicides due to the same were rare. The high land taxes of the 1870s, payable in cash regardless of the effects of frequent famines on farm output or productivity, combined with colonial protection of usury, money lenders, and landowner rights, contributed to widespread penury and frustration among cotton and other farmers, ultimately leading to the Deccan Riots of 1875–1877.

The colonial government enacted the Deccan Agriculturists’ Relief Act in 1879, to limit the interest rate charged by money lenders to Deccan cotton farmers, but applied it selectively to areas that served foreign cotton trading interests. Rural mortality rates, in predominantly agrarian areas of colonial India, were very high between 1850 and the 1940s. However, starvation related deaths far exceeded those by suicide, the latter being officially classified under "injuries". The death rate classified under "injuries", in 1897, was 79 per 100,000 people in Central Provinces of India and 37 per 100,000 people in Bombay Presidency.

Ganapathi and Venkoba Rao analyzed suicides in parts of Tamil Nadu in 1966. They recommended that the distribution of agricultural organophosphorus compounds be restricted. Similarly, Nandi et al. in 1979 noted the role of freely available agricultural insecticides in suicides in rural West Bengal and suggested that their availability be regulated. Hegde studied rural suicides in villages of northern Karnataka over 1962 to 1970 and stated the suicide incidence rate to be 5.7 per 100,000 population. Reddy, in 1993, reviewed high rates of farmer suicides in Andhra Pradesh and its relationship to farming size and productivity.

Reporting in popular press about farmers' suicides in India began in the mid-1990s, particularly by Palagummi Sainath. In the 2000s, the issue gained international attention and a variety of Indian government initiatives.

National Crime Records Bureau, an office of the Ministry of Home Affairs Government of India, has been collecting and publishing suicide statistics for India since the 1950s, as annual Accidental Deaths & Suicides in India report. It started separately collecting and publishing farmer's suicide statistics from 1995.
12,000 farmers committed suicide in Maharastra between 2015 and 2018.

States affected
According to a report by the National Crime Records Bureau, the states with the highest incidence of farmer suicide in 2015 were Maharashtra (3,030), Telangana (1,358), Karnataka (1,197), Madhya Pradesh (581), Andhra Pradesh (516), and Chhattisgarh (854).

Tamma Carleton, a researcher at the University of California at Berkeley, compared suicide and climate data, concluding that climate change in India may have "a strong influence" on suicides during the growing season, triggering more than 59,000 suicides in 30 years.

More than 23,000 farmers have committed suicide in the state of Maharashtra between 2009 and 2016.

Reasons
Various reasons have been offered to explain why farmers commit suicide in India, including floods, drought, debt, use of genetically modified seeds, public health, use of lower quantity pesticides due to less investments producing a decreased yield. There is no consensus on what the main causes might be but studies show suicide victims are motivated by more than one cause, on average three or more causes for committing suicide, the primary reason being the inability to repay loans. Panagariya, an economist at the World bank states, "farm-related reasons get cited only approximately 25 percent of the time as reasons for suicide" and "studies do consistently show greater debt burden and greater reliance on informal sources of credit" among farmers who commit suicide.

A study conducted in 2014, found that there are three specific characteristics associated with high-risk farmers: "those that grow cash crops such as coffee and cotton; those with 'marginal' farms of less than one hectare; and those with debts of 300 Rupees or more." The study also found that the Indian states in which these three characteristics are most common had the highest suicide rates and also accounted for "almost 75% of the variability in state-level suicides."

A 2012 study, did a regional survey on farmers' suicide in rural Vidarbha (Maharashtra) and applied a Smith's Saliency method to qualitatively rank the expressed causes among farming families who had lost someone to suicide. The expressed reasons in order of importance behind farmer suicides were – debt, alcohol addiction, environment, low produce prices, stress and family responsibilities, apathy, poor irrigation, increased cost of cultivation, private money lenders, use of chemical fertilizers and crop failure. In other words, debt to stress and family responsibilities were rated as significantly higher than fertilizers and crop failure. In a different study in the same region in 2006, indebtedness (87%) and deterioration in the economic status (74%) were found to be major factors for suicide.

Studies dated 2004 through 2006, identified several causes for farmers suicide, such as insufficient or risky credit systems, the difficulty of farming semi-arid regions, poor agricultural income, absence of alternative income opportunities, a downturn in the urban economy which forced non-farmers into farming, and the absence of suitable counseling services. In 2004, in response to a request from the All India Biodynamic and Organic Farming Association, the Mumbai High Court required the Tata Institute to produce a report on farmer suicides in Maharashtra, and the institute submitted its report in March 2005. The survey cited "government's lack of interest, the absence of a safety net for farmers and lack of access to information related to agriculture, as the chief causes for the desperate condition of farmers in the state."

An Indian study conducted in 2002, indicated an association between victims engaging in entrepreneurial activities (such as venturing into new crops, cash crops, and following market trends) and their failure in meeting expected goals due to a range of constraints.

Government economic policy
Economists like Utsa Patnaik, Jayati Ghosh, and Prabhat Patnaik suggest that structural changes in the macro-economic policy of the Indian Government that favored privatization, liberalization, and globalization are the root cause of farmer suicides. Business economists dispute this view.

GM crops
A number of social activist groups and studies proposed a link between expensive genetically modified crops and farmer suicides. Bt cotton (Bacillus thuringiensis cotton) was claimed to be responsible for farmer suicides. The Bt cotton seeds cost nearly twice as much as ordinary ones. The higher costs forced many farmers into taking ever larger loans, often from private moneylenders charging exorbitant interest rates (60% a year). The moneylenders force farmers to sell their cotton to them at a price lower than it fetches on the market. According to activists and studies, this created a source of debt and economic stress, ultimately suicides, among farmers. Increasing costs in farming associated with decreasing yields even with use of BT cotton seeds are often quoted cause of distress among farmers in central India. A 2015 study in Environmental Sciences Europe found that farmer suicide rates in India's rainfed areas were "directly related to increases in Bt cotton adoption." Factors leading to suicide included "high costs of BT cotton" and "ecological disruption and crop loss after the introduction of Bt cotton." Other scholars, however, say that this Bt cotton theory made certain assumptions and ignored field reality.

In 2008, a report published by the International Food Policy Research Institute, an agriculture policy think tank formed to promote the adoption of innovations in agricultural technology, based in Washington, D.C., noted that there was an absence of data relating to "numbers on the actual share of farmers committing suicide who cultivated cotton, let alone Bt cotton." In order to evaluate the "possible (and hypothetical)" existence of a connection the study employed a "second-best" assessment of evidence relating to farmer suicides firstly, and to the effects of Bt cotton secondly. The analysis revealed that there was no "clear general relationship between Bt cotton and farmer suicides" but also stated that it could not reject the "potential role of Bt cotton varieties in the observed discrete increase in farmer suicides in certain states and years, especially during the peak of 2004 in Andhra Pradesh and Maharashtra." The report also noted that farmer suicides predate the official commercial introduction of Bt cotton by Monsanto Mahyco in 2002 (and its unofficial introduction by Navbharat Seeds in 2001) and that such suicides were a fairly constant portion of the overall national suicide rate since 1997. The report noted that while Bt cotton may have been a factor in specific suicides, the contribution was likely marginal compared to socio-economic factors. Elsewhere, Gruere et al. discuss the introduction and increase in use of Bt cotton in the state of Madhya Pradesh since 2002, and the observed drop in total suicides among that state's farmers in 2006. They then question whether the impact of the increase in use of Bt cotton on farmers suicide in Madhya Pradesh has been to improve or worsen the situation.

In 2011, a review of the evidence regarding the relationship between Bt cotton and farmers' suicides in India was published in the Journal of Development Studies, also by researchers from IFPRI, which found that "Available data show no evidence of a 'resurgence' of farmer suicides. Moreover, Bt cotton technology has been very effective overall in India." Matin Qaim finds that Bt cotton is controversial in India, irrespective of the scholarly evidence. Anti-biotech activist groups in India repeat their claim that there is evidence of a link between Bt cotton and farmer's suicides, a claim that is perpetuated by mass media. This linking of farmer's suicide and the biotech industry has led to negative opinions in the public policy-making process.

Stone suggests that the arrival and expansion of GM cotton led to a campaign of misinformation, by all sides, exacerbating the farmer's situation; activists have fuelled the persistence of a legend of failure and rejection of Bt cotton with sensational claims of livestock death and farmer suicide, while the other side has been incorrectly pronouncing Bt cotton a major success based on literature that is actually inconclusive. The cotton cash crop farmer's situation is complex and continues to evolve, suggests Stone. Gilbert, in a 2013 article published in Nature, states, "contrary to popular myth, the introduction in 2002 of genetically modified Bt cotton is not associated with a rise in suicide rates among Indian farmers".

In another 2014 review, Ian Plewis states, "the available data does not support the view that farmer suicides have increased following the introduction of Bt cotton. Taking all states together, there is evidence to support the hypothesis that the reverse is true: male farmer suicide rates have actually declined after 2005 having been increasing before then".

Misdirection of government subsidies and funds
As per reports by the central government and NCRB, government farming subsidies from 1993 to 2018 mostly went to producers and dealers of seeds and fertilizers, and not to farmers. In 2017, Rs. 35,000 crores of loans and subsidies were given to entities in the cities of New Delhi and Chandigarh, cities that do not have any farmers. Similarly, in Maharashtra, 60% of government loans and subsidies were given to people and entities residing in Mumbai. This has resulted in money being circulated between the government, banks large and small corporations, and politicians, without any of it reaching farmers, aggravating their woes. Most farmer loans were less than Rs. 50,000.

Deadly drought
Due to poor artificial irrigation facilities, as much as 79.5% of India's farmland relies on flooding during monsoon season, so inadequate rainfall can cause droughts, making crop failure more common. In regions that have experienced droughts, crop yields have declined, and food for cattle has become scarcer. Agricultural regions that have been affected by droughts have subsequently seen their suicide rates increase.

Suicide idea
Economist Patel found that southern Indian states have ten times higher rates of suicides than some northern states. This difference, they say, is not because of misclassification of a person's death. The most common cause of suicide in South India is a combination of social issues, such as interpersonal and family problems, financial difficulties, and pre-existing mental illness. Suicidal ideation is as culturally accepted in south India as in some high-income countries. The high suicide rates in southern states of India may be, suggest Patel el al., in part because of social acceptance of suicide as a method to deal with difficulties. Suicide ideation among surviving family members of farmers' suicide victims is another worry. A recent study shows that almost a third of suicide survivors (family members left behind) had suicide ideation in one month prior to assessment.

Debt 
Many of the suicides by Indian farmers have been linked to the large amounts of debt and interest that many of these individuals accumulate. According to a 2006 study by P. Sainath, the percentage of farmers who were in debt in Andhra Pradesh, Punjab, Karnataka, and Maharashtra was 70%, 65%, 61%, and 60%, respectively.

Maharashtra's government field surveys
The Government of Maharashtra, concerned about the highest total number of farmer suicides among its rural populations, commissioned its own study into reasons. At its behest, Indira Gandhi Institute of Development Research in Mumbai did field research and found the top causes of farmers suicides to be: debt, low income, and crop failure, family issues such as illness and inability to pay celebration expenses for daughter's marriage, lack of secondary income occupations and lack of value-added opportunities.

Statistics of farmer suicide

The National Crime Records Bureau of India reported in its 2012 annual report, that 135,445 people committed suicide in India, of which 13,755 were farmers (11.2%). Of these, 5 out of 29 states accounted for 10,486 farmers suicides (76%) – Maharashtra, Andhra Pradesh, Karnataka, Madhya Pradesh and Kerala.

In 2011, a total of 135,585 people committed suicide, of which 14,027 were farmers. In 2010, 15,963 farmers in India committed suicide, while total suicides were 134,599. From 1995 to 2013, a total of 296,438 Indian farmers committed suicide. During the same period, about 9.5 million people died per year in India from other causes including malnutrition, diseases and suicides that were non-farming related, or about 171 million deaths from 1995 to 2013.

In 2012, the state of Maharashtra, with 3,786 farmers' suicides, accounted for about a quarter of the all India's farmer suicides total (13,754). From 2009 to 2016, a total of 25,613 farmers committed suicide in the state.

Farmer suicides rates in Bihar and Uttar Pradesh – two large states of India by size and population – have been about 10 times lower than Maharashtra, Kerala and Pondicherry. In 2012, there were 745 farmer suicides in Uttar Pradesh, a state with an estimated population of 205.43 million. In 2014, there were eight farmer suicides in Uttar Pradesh.

According to an IFPRI study, the number of suicides from 2005 to 2009 were 387, 905, 75, and 26, in Gujarat, Kerala, Punjab, and Tamil Nadu, respectively. While 1802 farmers committed suicide in Chhattisgarh in 2009 and 1126 in 2010, its farmers suicide dropped to zero in 2011, leading to accusations of data manipulation.

According to the 2012 statistics, from the National Crime Records Bureau, the farmer suicides statistics are as follows (Note: The NCRB lists suicides in the different employment categories, but it is not necessary that farming or crop-failure is the cause of the suicides listed in the "farmer" category):

As per National Crime Records Bureau, the number of suicides by farmers and farm labourers increased to 12,360 in 2014, against 11,772 in 2013. Of these suicides, 5,650 were farmers suicides.

As of 2018, the Indian government has not published data on farmer suicides since 2015. National Crime Records Bureau director Ish Kumar said that the data is under scrutiny and the report for 2016 is likely to be published later.

Farmers versus other professions
Patel et al., using a representative survey sample-based statistical study from 2001 and 2003, extrapolated likely suicide patterns in 2010 for India. They say suicide deaths in India among unemployed individuals and individuals in professions other than agricultural work were, collectively, about three times more frequent than they were in agricultural labourers and landowning cultivators. Even across professions in rural areas, Patel et al. find suicide among agricultural workers (including farmers) in India is not more frequent than any other profession.

The suicide incidence rate in India, on a 100,000 farmers basis, is unclear. All estimates are speculative because the actual total number of farmers by state or India in each year is not available. Farm suicides per 100,000 farmers can be reliably calculated for 2001 because accurate data on the number of farmers in the country and states are available for 2001 from the Census of India. The farm suicide rate was 12.9 suicides per 100,000 farmers, which was higher than the general suicide rate at 10.6 for 2001 in India. By gender, the suicide rate was 16.2 male farmer suicides per 100,000 male farmers compared to 12.5 male suicides per 100,000 for the general population. Among women, the suicide rate was 6.2 female farmer suicides per 100,000 female farmers compared to 8.5 female suicides per 100,000 for the general population.

Total number of farmers
Annual farmers' suicide incidence rate data on a 100,000 farmers basis, depending on the estimated total number of farmers for that year. Estimates for the total number of farmers in India vary widely. Some count the total number of cultivators, some include cultivators and agricultural laborers in their definition of total farmers, while others include anyone engaged in any form of farming and agriculture activity. Estimates for a total number of farmers in India, for 2011, accordingly range from 95.8 million (8%) to 263 million (22%) to 450 million (38%), out of a total population of over 1.2 billion. Others estimate the total number of farmers in India to be about 600 million (50% of the total population). With about 14,000 suicides in 2011 by those engaged in farming and agricultural activities, the different estimates of total farmers has led to different suicide incidence rate estimates on per 100,000 farmers basis. Additionally, the reliability of official statistics has been questioned. K. Nagaraj suggests that official data may be overestimating the number of total farmers in India, and undercounting the total number of farmer suicides every year. Tom Brass, in contrast, suggests that official census and surveys in India systematically underestimate the total number of people engaged in agriculture in India.

Responses to farmers' suicides
The government appointed a number of inquiries to look into the causes of farmers' suicide and farm-related distress in general. Krishak Ayog (National Farmer Commission) visited all suicide-prone farming regions of India, then in 2006 published three reports with its recommendations. Subsequently, former prime minister Manmohan Singh visited Vidarbha in 2006 and promised a package of ₹110 billion (about $2.4 billion).

2006 relief package
In 2006, the Government of India identified 31 districts in the four states of Andhra Pradesh, Maharashtra, Karnataka, and Kerala with a high relative incidence of farmer suicides. A special rehabilitation package was launched to mitigate the distress of these farmers. The package provided debt relief to farmers, improved supply of institutional credit, improved irrigation facilities, employed experts and social service personnel to provide farming support services, and introduced subsidiary income opportunities through horticulture, livestock, dairy, and fisheries. The Government of India also announced ex-gratia cash assistance from Prime Ministers National Relief Fund to the farmers. Additionally, among other things, the Government of India announced:

 In the Vidarbha region of Maharashtra, which had received considerable mass media news coverage on farmer suicides, all farmer families of Vidarbha in six affected districts of Maharashtra were given a cash sum of  each, to help pay off the debt principal.
  in interest owed, as of 30 June 2006, was waived. The burden of payment was shared equally between the Central and the State government.
Special teams comprising NABARD and banks were deputed to ensure fresh credit starts flowing to all farmers of the region.

Agricultural debt waiver and debt relief scheme, 2008
This spending was aimed at the writing part of the loan principal as well as the interest owed by the farmers. Direct agricultural loan by stressed farmers under the so-called Kisan Credit Card was also to be covered under this Scheme.

Regional initiatives
Various state governments in India have launched their own initiatives to help prevent farmer suicides. The government of Maharashtra set up a dedicated group to deal with farm distress in 2006 known as the Vasantrao Naik Sheti Swavlamban Mission, based in Amravati.  A group to study the Farmers Suicides was also constituted by the Government of Karnataka under the chairmanship of Dr. Veeresh, former vice-chancellor of Agricultural University and Prof Deshpande as a member.

Maharashtra Bill to regulate farmer loan terms, 2008
The State government of Maharashtra, one of the most farmer suicide-affected states, passed the Money Lending (Regulation) Act, 2008 to regulate all private money lending to farmers. The bill set maximum not legally allowed interest rates on any loans to farmers, setting it to be slightly above the money lending rate by Reserve Bank of India, and it also covered pending loans.

Maharashtra Relief Package, 2010
The State Government of Maharashtra made it illegal, in 2010, for non-licensed moneylenders from seeking loan repayment. The State Government also announced that it will form Village Farmer Self Help Groups to disburse government-financed loans, a low rate Crop Insurance program whose premium will be paid 50% by the farmer and 50% by the government, and the launch of alternate income opportunities such as poultry, dairy, and sericulture for farmers in suicide-prone districts.

Kerala Farmers' Debt Relief Commission (Amendment) Bill, 2012
Kerala, in 2012, amended the Kerala Farmers' Debt Relief Commission Act, 2006 to extend benefits to all distressed farmers with loans through 2011. It cited continuing farmer suicides as a motivation.

2013 diversify income sources package
In 2013, the Government of India launched a Special Livestock Sector and Fisheries Package for farmers in suicide-prone regions of Andhra Pradesh, Maharashtra, Karnataka, and Kerala. The package was aimed to diversify the income sources of farmers.

Effectiveness of government response
The government's response and relief packages have generally been ineffective, misdirected, and flawed, states Surinder Sud. It has focused on credit and loan, rather than income, productivity, and farmer prosperity. Due to Anti Farmer laws, there is no scope for farmers to do the business or sell or lease farm or farm products. Assistance in paying off outstanding principal and interest helps the money lenders but has failed to create reliable and good sources of income for the farmer going forward. The usurious moneylenders continue to offer loans at interest rates between 24 and 50 percent, while the income-generating potential of the land the farmer works on has remained low and subject to weather conditions. Sud states that the government has failed to understand that debt relief just postpones the problem and a more lasting answer to farmer distress can only come from reliable income sources, higher crop yields per hectare, irrigation and other infrastructure security. Golait, in a Reserve Bank of India paper, acknowledged the positive role of crop diversification initiative announced in government's response to reports of farmer suicides. Golait added, "Indian agriculture still suffers from: i) poor productivity, ii) falling water levels, iii) expensive credit, iv) a distorted market, v) many middlemen and intermediaries who increase cost but do not add much value, vi) laws that stifle private investment, vii) controlled prices, viii) poor infrastructure and ix) inappropriate research. Thus the approach with a mere emphasis on credit in isolation from the above factors will not help agriculture". Furthermore, recommended Golait, a more pro-active role in creating and maintaining reliable irrigation and other agriculture infrastructure is necessary to address farmer distress in India.

International comparison
Farmer's suicide is a global phenomenon. Outside India, studies in Sri Lanka, the United States, Canada, and Australia have identified farming as a high-stress profession that is associated with a higher suicide rate than the general population. This is particularly true among small-scale farmers and after periods of economic distress. Fraser et al., similarly, after a review of 52 scholarly publications, conclude that farming populations in the United Kingdom, Europe, Australia, Canada, and the United States have the highest rates of suicide of any industry and there is growing evidence that those involved in farming are at higher risk of developing mental health problems. Their review claims a wide range of reasons behind farmers suicide globally including mental health issues, physical environment, family problems, economic stress, and uncertainties. Significantly higher suicide rate among farmers than the general population has been reported in developed countries such as the UK and the US.

In popular culture
The 2008 film Summer 2007 by producer Atul Pandey, focused on the issue of farmer suicides in Maharashtra's Vidarbha region, as did the 2010s Bollywood films Kissan and Peepli Live, and 2014 Tamil film Kaththi. Prior to this The Dying Fields, a documentary directed by Fred de Sam Lazaro was aired in August 2007 on Wide Angle (TV series). The 2010 award-winning film Jhing Chik Jhing is based around the emotive issue of farmer suicides in Maharashtra. It looks at how the farmer has very little in his control and looks at the impact of indebtedness on his family. Mitti, a movie by Anshul Sinha released in 2018 showcased the agrarian crisis and its possible solutions.

In 2009, the International Museum of Women included an examination of the impact of farmers' suicides on the lives of the farmers' wives and children in their exhibition Economica: Women and the Global Economy. Their slideshow "Growing Debt" and accompanying essay by curator Masum Momaya entitled "Money of Her Own" showed how many widows were left with the burden of their husbands' debts, and were forced to work as indentured servants to repay the debt. The widows were also unlikely to remarry because other men in the community were unwilling to take on the widows' debts for themselves.

See also
 Agricultural insurance in India
 Debt bondage in India
 Farmers' suicides in western Odisha
 Suicide in India

References

 
 Suicides in India
 Society of Maharashtra
 Vidarbha
 Manmohan Singh administration
Global issues